Cabin fever is restlessness from being in a confined area.

Cabin Fever may also refer to:

Books

Cabin Fever, a 1918 novel by B. M. Bower
Cabin Fever, a 1990 novel by Elizabeth Jolley
Diary of a Wimpy Kid: Cabin Fever, a graphic novel by Jeff Kinney

Film and TV
Cabin Fever (2000 film), a 2000 Norwegian film by Mona J. Hoel
Cabin Fever (2002 film), a 2002 horror film by Eli Roth
Cabin Fever 2: Spring Fever, the sequel to the 2002 horror film
Cabin Fever: Patient Zero, the prequel to the 2002 horror film
Cabin Fever (2016 film), the remake to the 2002 horror film
Cabin Fever (2020 film), a 2020 South African film by Tim Greene
"Cabin Fever" (Lost), a 2008 episode of Lost
Cabin Fever (TV series), a 2003 Irish reality TV show
"Cabin Fever / Rinse & Spit", a 1993 episode of Rocko's Modern Life
"Cabin Fever", a documentary of the making of the Black Crowes' Before the Frost...Until the Freeze
"Cabin Fever", a 2015 episode of NCIS
"Cabin Fever", the fiftieth episode of Sonic Boom
Cabin Fever!, an online spin-off of the BBC Radio 4 sitcom Cabin Pressure.

Music

Albums
Cabin Fever (Michael Stanley Band album), 1978
Cabin Fever (Flying Burrito Brothers album), 1985
Cabin Fever (Lenny Breau album), 1997
Cabin Fever (Rasputina album), 2002
Cabin Fever (Scaramanga Six album), 2004
Cabin Fever (Corb Lund album), 2012
Cabin Fever (Purple Kiss album), 2023
Cabin Fever (mixtape), a 2011 mixtape by Wiz Khalifa

Songs
"Cabin Fever", a song by Nick Cave and the Bad Seeds from From Her to Eternity
"Cabin Fever", a song by Super Furry Animals from Love Kraft
"Cabin Fever", a song from Muppet Treasure Island
"Cabin Fever", a song by Wiz Khalifa from Cabin Fever
"Cabin Fever", a song by Marillion from The Making of Brave
"Cabin Fever", a song by Roam from Backbone
"Cabin Fever", a song by The Wonder Stuff from Construction for the Modern Idiot
"Cabin Fever", a song by Jaden Smith

Events
Cabin Fever Expo, a model engineering show and auction held in York, PA, USA each year since 1997